The 1957 Japan Series was the Nippon Professional Baseball (NPB) championship series for the 1957 season. It was the eighth Japan Series and featured the Pacific League champions, the Nishitetsu Lions, against the Central League champions, the Yomiuri Giants.

Summary

Matchups

Game 1
Saturday, October 26, 1957 – 1:02 pm at Heiwadai Stadium in Fukuoka

Game 2
Sunday, October 27, 1957 – 1:02 pm at Heiwadai Stadium in Fukuoka

Game 3
Wednesday, October 30, 1957 – 1:33 pm at Korakuen Stadium in Bunkyō, Tokyo

Game 4
Thursday, October 31, 1957 – 1:36 pm at Korakuen Stadium in Bunkyō, Tokyo

Game 5
Friday, November 1, 1957 – 1:32 pm at Korakuen Stadium in Bunkyō, Tokyo

See also
1957 World Series

References

Japan Series
Japan Series
Japan Series
Japan series
Japan series